WBLE (100.5 FM) is a radio station broadcasting a New Country music format, licensed to Batesville, Mississippi, United States.  The station is currently owned by J. Boyd Ingram and Carol B. Ingram.

References

External links

Country radio stations in the United States
BLE